Cable television in the Philippines was introduced in 1969 with the first commercial service of Nuvue Cablevision (later absorbed into Sky Cable); Satellite television in the Philippines was introduced in 2001 with the first commercial broadcast of Dream Satellite TV (now defunct); and IPTV and digital over-the-top streaming services in the Philippines was introduced in 2010 with the first commercial broadcast of iWant TV (now iWant TFC), before the arrival of international-based streaming services such as iflix and Netflix.

There are two non-profit organizations that represent the cable television industry, namely: the Federation of International Cable TV and Telecommunications Association of the Philippines (FICTAP), and the Philippine Cable and Telecommunications Association (PCTA).

Cable television
Sky Cable, Destiny Cable, and Cablelink are currently the primary cable operators in the country. There are also local regional companies, such as Air Cable in Pampanga and Rizal, Asian Vision in Zambales, Batangas and Quezon, Royal Cable in Laguna, Filproducts TV in Visayas, and Parasat Cable TV in Northern Mindanao.

Satellite television

Direct-to-home satellite television is offered through G Sat, Cignal, and SatLite.

Previously, Sky Direct offered the service from 2016 to 2020.

Internet television
With the advent of digital streaming services in 2016, there are active video streaming services available in the Philippines namely:

See also
Television in the Philippines
Digital television in the Philippines

References

External links
Federation of International Cable TV and Telecommunications Association of the Philippines
Philippine Cable and Telecommunications Association

 
Cable
Cable